SRO GT2 is a class of Grand tourer racing cars aimed at gentleman drivers and maintained by the SRO Motorsports Group. Despite the name, this class slots between Group GT4 and Group GT3 in terms of performance. The class also shouldn’t be confused with the Group GT2 from the early 2000s. The class uses a Balance of performance to allow for close competition between competitors.

History 
The new GT2 category was announced by the SRO in 2018. It was created as the GT3 category became more focussed on downforce and also harder to drive for amateur drivers. The GT2 cars would mainly focus on having a powerful engine with 640-700hp, which would be more powerful than a 560hp GT3 engine, while having low downforce more similar to the GT4 category.

The first GT2 race was a Porsche single-make event at the 2019 24 Hours of Spa, fielding the 911 GT2 RS Clubsport alongside a few Porsche 935s. A second GT2 car, the Audi R8 LMS GT2, also made its public debut at the same time. The R8 GT2 saw its race debut at the 2019 GT Sports Club finale at Barcelona.

During 2020, both KTM and Lamborghini launched their GT2 models, the KTM X-bow GT2 and the Lamborghini Huracán Super Trofeo GT2.

In 2021 the GT Sportsclub was renamed to the GT2 European Series, and only use the SRO GT2 class cars to compete.

Homologated cars 
As of March 26 2022, five cars have been homologated with two more cars, the Mercedes-AMG GT2 and the Maserati MC20 GT2 in coming in 2023. A few not-homologated cars have also raced in GT2 competition, such as the second generation Porsche 935, Ferrari 488 Challenge Evo and the Mercedes-AMG GT Track series.

Series 
Since 2020, SRO GT2 cars have been either exclusive to or in a distinct class in each of the following series:

Bold indicates an active series that currently uses SRO GT2 cars.

GT2 European Series

GT America Series

Additionally, the following series allow SRO GT2 cars to participate alongside other competitors:

GT Sports Club America

GT Winter Series

24H Series

Nürburgring Langstrecken Serie

Belcar

ESET V4 Cup

Danish endurance championship
Grand tourers
Sports car racing

References